Sonni Ragnar Nattestad (born 5 August 1994) is a Faroese professional footballer who plays as a centre-back for B36 and the Faroe Islands national team.

Career

Club
On 12 December 2016, Nattestad signed for Norwegian Eliteserien club Molde FK.

Nattestad joined Danish 1st Division club FC Fredericia on 1 February 2019. After a half year, on 10 September 2019, Nattestad got his contract terminated.

In January 2021 he signed for the  League of Ireland Premier Division side Dundalk. He made his competitive debut for the club on 12 March 2021 in the 2021 President's Cup against league champions Shamrock Rovers at Tallaght Stadium. The game was an eventful one for Nattestad as he opened the scoring in the 42nd minute with a header from a Patrick McEleney corner, before being sent-off in the 59th minute for a tackle on Graham Burke as his side went on to draw 1–1 before winning the trophy on penalties.

On 2 January 2022, Nattestad signed a contract with Norwegian Eliteserien club FK Jerv. However, the contract was terminated just 2 hours later.

International career
Nattestad was born in the Faroe Islands to a Haitian-born father who was adopted in the Faroe Islands, and Faroese mother. He represents the Faroe Islands national team.

Career statistics

International goals
Scores and results list Faroe Islands' goal tally first, score column indicates score after each Nattestad goal.

Honours
Dundalk
 President of Ireland's Cup: 2021

References

External links

1994 births
Living people
People from Tórshavn
Faroese footballers
Association football central defenders
Sonni Nattestad
07 Vestur players
FC Midtjylland players
AC Horsens players
Vejle Boldklub players
Sonni Nattestad
Sonni Nattestad
Molde FK players
Aalesunds FK players
FC Fredericia players
B36 Tórshavn players
Dundalk F.C. players
FK Jerv players
2. deild players
Faroe Islands Premier League players
1. deild players
Danish Superliga players
Danish 1st Division players
Sonni Nattestad
Norwegian Third Division players
Norwegian First Division players
League of Ireland players
Faroe Islands youth international footballers
Faroe Islands under-21 international footballers
Faroe Islands international footballers
Faroese people of Haitian descent
Faroese expatriate footballers
Faroese expatriate sportspeople in Iceland
Expatriate footballers in Iceland
Expatriate men's footballers in Denmark
Faroese expatriate sportspeople in Norway
Expatriate footballers in Norway
Expatriate association footballers in the Republic of Ireland